Un color para tu piel, is a Mexican telenovela produced by Televisa and originally transmitted by Telesistema Mexicano.

Cast 
Héctor Andremar
Carolina Barret
Alejandro Ciangherotti
Andrea Cotto

References

External links 

Mexican telenovelas
Televisa telenovelas
Spanish-language telenovelas
1967 telenovelas
1967 Mexican television series debuts
1967 Mexican television series endings